Nicholas Tandi Dammen (born December 1950) is an Indonesian diplomat. He is the Ambassador of Indonesia to the Republic of Korea in Seoul from January 2009 until 2012.

Graduated from University of Hassanudin, Makasar, Indonesia and University of Humberside, United Kingdom, he joined the Ministry of Foreign Affairs in December 1975. He has been on diplomatic posting to Papua New Guinea (1980–1982), Finland (1982–1985), United Kingdom (1987–1991), Singapore (1994–1996), the World Trade Organization and the Indonesian Permanent Mission to the United Nations in Geneva (1996–1998). He was later posted as Deputy Chief of Mission in United Kingdom (2001–2004), Director General for Policy Planning and Development Agency of the Ministry of Foreign Affairs of Indonesia (2004–2006), and the Deputy Secretary-General of Association of Southeast Asian Nations (ASEAN) from 2006 to 2009.

References

1950 births
Living people
People from Tana Toraja Regency
Indonesian Roman Catholics
Ambassadors of Indonesia to South Korea
Indonesian diplomats
Alumni of the University of Lincoln